Polo Villaamil (born November 18, 1979 in Madrid) is a Spanish auto racing driver.

Career
After previously competing in karting, Villaamil won the Spanish Formula Renault Championship in 1997. In 1998 he competed in one race in International Formula 3000. In 1999, he raced for Coloni Motorsport in two races of  International F3000, and four races of the Italian F3000 series.

In 2001 Villaamil finished eighth in the Euro Formula 3000 series. For 2002 he moved to the World Series by Nissan, finishing tenth in the standings. He took a win for RC Motorsport the following year, finishing eleventh in the standings.

In 2005 he raced in his home round of the World Touring Car Championship for the GR Asia team.

References

External links

1979 births
Living people
Sportspeople from Madrid
Spanish racing drivers
Auto GP drivers
World Touring Car Championship drivers

Euronova Racing drivers
Fortec Motorsport drivers
Scuderia Coloni drivers
International Formula 3000 drivers
Campos Racing drivers